
Year 135 BC was a year of the pre-Julian Roman calendar. At the time it was known as the Year of the Consulship of Flaccus and Piso (or, less frequently, year 619 Ab urbe condita) and the Sixth Year of Jianyuan. The denomination 135 BC for this year has been used since the early medieval period, when the Anno Domini calendar era became the prevalent method in Europe for naming years.

Events 
 By place 
 Roman Republic 
 The First Servile War starts in Sicily.
 Servius Fulvius Flaccus defeats an uprising of the Ardiaei in Illyria.
 Marcus Cosconius defeats the Scordisci in Thrace.

 Bactria 
 Menander I, king of the Indo-Greek Kingdom dies and is succeeded by Epander.

 China 
 Grand Empress Dowager Dou dies, which allows her grandson Emperor Wu to exert greater control over the empire.
 Minyue attacks Nanyue, which are both vassal states of the Han Dynasty. The Han send two armies against Minyue under Wang Hui and Han Anguo, and Minyue's king Zou Ying is killed by his brother Zou Yushan, who then surrenders to the Han.
 Emperor Wu makes Zou Chou the king of Minyue, but Zou Yushan carves out two thirds of Minyue as the state of Dongyue, which Wu then recognizes.
 A Han military campaign against the Dian Kingdom establishes a military commandery in the Yunnan region.

Births 
 Mithridates VI, king of Pontus (d. 63 BC)
 Pompeius Strabo, Roman consul and father of Pompeius Magnus (d. 87 BC)
 Posidonius of Apamea, Greek Stoic philosopher and scientist (d. 51 BC)
 Sima Qian, Chinese historian of the Han Dynasty (approximate date)

Deaths 
 Menander I, king of the Indo-Greek Kingdom
 Simon Maccabaeus, prince of Judea and High Priest of Judea

References

Bibliography